David Martin and Rajeev Ram were the defending champions. Ram chose not to participate, Martin partnered up with Lester Cook, but they lost to Andrew Anderson and Fritz Wolmarans in the semifinals.
South African players won this tournament. They defeated qualifiers Brett Joelson and Chris Klingemann 6–2, 6–3 in the final.

Seeds

Draw

Draw

References
 Doubles Draw
 Qualifying Doubles Draw

USTA Challenger of Oklahoma - Doubles
USTA Challenger of Oklahoma